Marion is a city in Williamson and Johnson Counties, Illinois, United States, and is the county seat of Williamson County. The population was 16,855 at the 2020 census. It is part of a dispersed urban area that developed out of the early 20th-century coal fields.

Today Marion serves as the largest retail trade center in Southern Illinois with its central location along Interstate 57 and Illinois Route 13. It was dubbed the “Hub of the Universe” by former mayor Robert L. Butler.

The city is part of the Marion-Herrin Micropolitan Area and is a part of the Carbondale-Marion-Herrin, Illinois Combined Statistical Area with 123,272 residents, the sixth most populous Combined statistical area in Illinois.

History 
Following the creation of Williamson County out of the south half of Franklin County by the Illinois General Assembly, three commissioners appointed by the lawmakers met at Bainbridge, Illinois, on August 19, 1839, for the purpose of locating a new county seat as close to the center of the county as possible. The site sat in a small open grassland known as Poor Prairie. For a name, they chose Marion to honor American Revolutionary War hero Gen. Francis "Swamp Fox" Marion.

William and Bethany Benson had entered the quarter-quarter section of land that contained the future site of Marion just the previous year on September 8, 1838. He had lived in the county at least since 1817, and was the first settler to enter land in Poor Prairie. At the time the commissioners platted Marion, he had a small crop of corn and wheat growing over what became the public square.

The Williamson County Court organized in Marion on October 7, 1839, at the Benson log cabin. Overflow crowds had to use pumpkins for stools. The federal government established a post office at Marion on January 30, 1840, and the legislature incorporated the community as a city on February 24, 1841.

1982 tornado 

On May 29, 1982, one of the larger tornadoes in Illinois history, rated F4, hit the city of Marion and Williamson County. Ten people died and 200 people were injured after this tornado ripped across a  stretch. The Shawnee Village apartment complex was destroyed, and the Marion Ford-Mercury dealership sustained heavy damage. This tornado caused between $85 million and $100 million in damages. A memorial to the ten people who perished that day was later erected on the south side of Tower Square Plaza.

Geography
Marion is in central Williamson County, with a narrow strip of city limits extending south beyond Creal Springs to the valley of Sugar Creek in Johnson County.

Demographics

As of the census of 2000, there were 16,035 people, 6,902 households, and 4,341 families residing in the city. The racial makeup of the city was 92.89% White, 4.34% African American, 0.24% Native American, 0.83% Asian, 0.05% Pacific Islander, 0.44% from other races, and 1.21% from two or more races. Hispanic or Latino of any race were 1.60% of the population.

There were 6,902 households, out of which 28.1% had children under the age of 18 living with them, 47.0% were married couples living together, 12.5% had a female householder with no husband present, and 37.1% were non-families. 33.1% of all households were made up of individuals, and 16.4% had someone living alone who was 65 years of age or older.  The average household size was 2.25 and the average family size was 2.86.

In the city the population was spread out, with 22.8% under the age of 18, 8.3% from 18 to 24, 26.5% from 25 to 44, 22.5% from 45 to 64, and 20.0% who were 65 years of age or older.  The median age was 40 years.  For every 100 females, there were 87.9 males.  For every 100 females age 18 and over, there were 84.4 males.

The median income for a household in the city was $30,364, and the median income for a family was $39,275. Males had a median income of $31,520 versus $22,609 for females. The per capita income for the city was $19,073.  About 11.2% of families and 14.9% of the population were living below the poverty line, including 22.9% of those under the age of 18 and 10.6% of those 65 and older.

Major employers
As of March 30, 2009, the largest employers located inside the city limits were as follows:
 Aisin Mfg., three auto parts plants first established in 2002 employing 1820 employees.
 Pepsi / MidAmerica, soft drinks in operation since 1935 employing 600 workers.
 Heartland Regional Medical Center, formerly Marion Memorial Hospital first established in 1953, employing 600 employees.
 VA Medical Center, established in 1942, employs 600 workers.
 Blue Cross/Blue Shield claims processing center established in 1983 employing 350 employees.

Other major nearby employers include:
 John A. Logan College in Carterville, established in 1967, employing 850 workers.
 Herrin Hospital in Herrin, established in 1913, employs 450 employees.
 U.S. Dept. of Justice / Bureau of Prisons employs 342 workers at United States Penitentiary, Marion southwest of the city.
 Southern Illinois Power Coop just south of Marion employing 120 at its Lake of Egypt power plant. Established in 1963.

Arts and culture 
Downtown Marion is home to the Little Egypt Arts Gallery operated by the Little Egypt Arts Association as well as the Williamson County Historical Society museum and the Marion Carnegie Library. The major arts and culture institution though is the Marion Cultural and Civic Center.

Marion Cultural and Civic Center 
In 2004, the Marion Civic Center was awarded the Frank Lloyd Wright Award - Special Recognition from the American Institute of Architects, Illinois Chapter, at the organization's annual ceremony. The  facility, designed by White and Borgognoni Architects, was completed in June 2004. After a 1997 fire destroyed the city's former civic center, the new facility was crafted using parts of the old Orpheum Theater building.

The grand opening of the Orpheum Theatre was on January 2, 1922. Built in the southwest corner of the downtown square, she was the flagship of a chain of vaudeville and moving picture theaters constructed to tap into the wealth generated by agriculture and mining in Southern Illinois. The Orpheum Theatre sat over 900, and was ornately decorated in a mix of Renaissance and Neoclassical styles, complete with gold leaf, elaborate plasterwork, and a multicolored terra-cotta facade.

The Orpheum was quite successful until the advent of television. Decreasing profits forced the Orpheum to exclusively be a motion picture theater in the mid-1950s and to close in 1971. The City of Marion purchased the building in 1973 with the intent of constructing a parking lot. The Mayor and the City Council reconsidered their plan when they found that their citizenry was in favor of restoring the old theater for use by the community as a cultural and entertainment center.

During the early morning hours, of March 10, 1997, a blaze quickly raced through the Civic Center, and totally gutted the theater, leaving it a smoldering shell after the blaze was put out. The facade of the Orpheum was salvaged, but the remainder of the theater was razed, and in 2000, it was decided that a new Cultural and Civic Center would be built on the site of the old Orpheum and a couple of other demolished neighboring structures.

Sister City
Marion became a sister city to Kanie, Japan, on March 26, 2010.

Tourism
Tourism promotion and marketing in Marion is conducted at the county level with a county bed tax of five percent. Forty percent of that amount goes to the Williamson County Tourism Bureau and the remaining 60 percent to the Williamson County Events Commission for debt service on the bonds used to build the Williamson County Pavilion, a multi-use meeting and convention center immediately north of the Illinois Centre Mall in Marion. That building also houses the tourism bureau.

Camping facilities in the city include the Motel Marion and the new Marion Campground & RV Park, both located off of Exit 53 on the east side of the interstate.

Major attractions that draw visitors to Marion include Southern Illinois Miners' games at Rent One Park, events at Southern Illinois University-Carbondale, The Southern Illinois Roller Girls bouts at the Williamson Co Pavilion, approximately two dozen wineries within a  radius of the city including those on the Shawnee Hills Wine Trail and the Southern Illinois Wine Trail, Crab Orchard National Wildlife Refuge adjacent to the city, Lake of Egypt immediately to the south and the Shawnee National Forest and various state parks that stretch along the Shawnee Hills from river to river.

Sports

Government 

Marion's city government is led by Mayor Mike Absher who assumed office on April 22, 2019 after defeating Incumbent Anthony Rinella who was appointed after longtime mayor Robert L. Butler resigned. The city operates on a city commission system of government with the mayor and four city commissioners, each elected for four-year terms.

The council calendar calls for meetings on the 2nd and 4th Mondays of the month. However, the council generally extends those meetings, and with the exception of major holidays, usually ends up meeting every Monday evening at City Hall.

The city is also a home rule community, a status that gives the council greater flexibility to act than a typical city commission form of government.

The Marion Park District is independent of city government. It operates the parks system under a separately elected five-member board. The library board though is appointed by the mayor and city council.

Media
The Daily Republican, a newspaper, is based in Marion.

Education
Marion Community Unit School District 2 operates public schools, including Marion High School.

Infrastructure

Transportation

Air service 

Veterans Airport of Southern Illinois, formerly Williamson County Regional Airport, serves the area and is located at the extreme western edge of the city. Cape Air provides daily passenger flights to St. Louis-Lambert International Airport and Nashville International Airport.

Rail service 
Both the Union Pacific and Burlington Northern railroads have lines running through the city. Local service from those lines is provided by the Crab Orchard and Egyptian Railroad headquartered in Marion.

Notable people 

 Conrad Keene Allen, exploration geologist
 Willis Allen, Illinois attorney, senator, and representative; lived in Marion
 Cory Bailey, professional baseball player in minors, majors and China
 Wallace A. Bandy, Illinois legislator and businessman
 Babe Borton, Major League Baseball first baseman for Chicago White Sox, New York Yankees, St. Louis Terriers and St Louis Browns
 Nancy Elizabeth Brown, United States Navy Vice Admiral
 O. H. Burnett, Illinois legislator and lawyer
 Homer M. Butler, Illinois legislator and newspaper editor
 Robert L. Butler, mayor of Marion from May 1963 to January 31, 2018
 Edward E. Denison, representative who practiced law in Marion
 Warren W. Duncan, Illinois Supreme Court justice
 James Felts, Illinois politician and newspaper editor
 Ray Fosse, Major League Baseball catcher for Cleveland Indians, Oakland Athletics, Seattle Mariners and Milwaukee Brewers
 William L. Harris, Illinois legislator and businessman
 Judith Ivey, Tony Award-winning actress
 Gene Johns, Illinois legislator and businessman
Williametta Spencer, composer
 Dolph Stanley, legendary high school and college basketball coach
 Richard G. Wilson,  soldier and posthumous recipient of U.S. military's highest decoration, the Medal of Honor, for actions in Korean War
 Jason Pargin, editor of Cracked.com and author of John Dies at the End

References

Further reading
 Hubbs, Barbara Burr. 1939, reprint 1979. Pioneer Folks and Places. Marion, Ill.: Williamson County Historical Society.
 Erwin, Milo. 1876, Rep. 1976. History of Williamson County, Illinois. Marion, Ill.: Williamson County Historical Society.
 Erwin, Milo, and Jon Musgrave. 2006. The Bloody Vendetta of Southern Illinois. Marion, Ill.: IllinoisHistory.com. 240 pages.

External links

Marion Chamber of Commerce

 
Cities in Illinois
Cities in Williamson County, Illinois
Cities in Johnson County, Illinois
County seats in Illinois
Mining communities in Illinois
Populated places established in 1839
1839 establishments in Illinois